Seabirds are birds adapted to a marine life. 

Seabird(s) or Sea bird(s) may also refer to:

In music and literature:
 Seabird (band), an American rock band
 "The Seabirds", a song by The Triffids from the album Born Sandy Devotional
 "Seabirds" (song), an unreleased Pink Floyd song written for the soundtrack to More
 Seabird (novel), a 1948 book by Holling Clancy Holling
 "Seabird", a song by the Alessi Brothers from the 1976 album Alessi

Places:
 Sea Bird Island (British Columbia)
 Seabird, Western Australia

In ships and aircraft:
 Sea Bird (ship), an 18th-century merchant ship
 Seabird Half Rater, a classic sailing boat design
 USS Sea Bird (1863),  a schooner in the American Civil War
 CSS Sea Bird, a steamer in the Confederate States Navy
 Lakes Sea Bird, a two-seat floatplane built in 1912
 Fleetwings Sea Bird, an American amphibious aircraft of the 1930s
 Seabird Airlines, a Turkish airline

Other:
 Sea-Bird, a Thoroughbred racehorse also known as Sea Bird, Sea-Bird II and Sea Bird II